This is a list of the tallest buildings in Montreal that ranks skyscrapers in the city of Montreal, Canada, by height. There are currently 50 buildings and structures in Montreal greater than 100 m (328 ft). The tallest building in the city is the 51-storey,   1000 de La Gauchetière

Municipal regulations forbid any building from exceeding the height of Mount Royal, or 233 m (764 ft) above mean sea level. Above-ground height is further limited in most areas and a minority of the downtown land plots are allowed to contain buildings exceeding 120 metres in height. The maximum limit is currently attained by 1000 de La Gauchetière and 1250 René-Lévesque, the latter of which is shorter, but built on higher ground. To build higher than 1000 de La Gauchetière while respecting this limit would be to build on the lowest part of downtown; the maximum height there would be approximately 210 metres.

The history of skyscrapers in Montreal began with the completion of the eight-storey-tall New York Life Insurance Building in 1888. Most high-rise construction in Montreal occurred in two periods: the late 1920s to the early 1930s and then from the early 1960s to the early 1990s.

In the 21st century, the rate of high-rise construction in the city increased again with more under construction in 2014 than in any other North American city bar Toronto and New York City.

Tallest buildings
This list ranks buildings in Montreal that stand at least 100 m (328 ft) tall, based on CTBUH height measurement standards. This includes spires and architectural details but does not include antenna masts. An equal sign (=) following a rank indicates the same height between two or more buildings. Freestanding observation and/or telecommunication towers, while not habitable buildings, are included for comparison purposes; however, they are not ranked. One such tower is the Tour de Montréal.

Tallest under construction or proposed

Under construction
The following is a list of buildings that are under construction in Montreal and are planned to rise at least .

Timeline of tallest buildings

This lists buildings that once held the title of tallest building in Montreal.

See also

 List of tallest buildings in Canada
 List of tallest buildings in Quebec
 Architecture of Montreal

Notes

References

Montreal
Buildings, tallest
Lists of buildings and structures in Quebec